Ulsaha Committee is a 2014 Malayalam comedy film directed by Akku Akbar and starring Jayaram, Baburaj, Kalabhavan Shajon, Sheela and Isha Talwar.

Plot

The film is about a school drop out whose pursuit for amazing scientific inventions lands him in trouble.

Cast
 Jayaram as Apoorvan
 Baburaj as Chopra
 Kalabhavan Shajon as Babumon
 Sheela as Rosemary
 Isha Talwar as Rosemary
 Vinutha Lal as Haritha S. Nair
 Suraj Venjaramood as Natholi
 Vinaya Prasad
 Lakshmi Priya as Chandrika
 Sunil Sukhada
 Kochu Preman
 Joy Mathew as Thathamangalam Narayana Ayyengar
 Sasi Kalinga
 Hareesh Perumanna as jallian kanaran
 Shaju K. S.
 Nelson
 Neethu Thomas 
Thomas Unniyadan as Doctor

Reception
The film received negative reviews from critics. Sify.com wrote: "Disturbingly loud and totally pointless, all this film manages is to make you cringe." The Times of India rated the film 1.5 in a scale of 5 and said, "the film turns out to be a nagging watch with its never-ending stream of loud, boisterous, tasteless humour. Rating the film 1.5/5, Veeyen of Nowrunning.com said, "Ulsaha Committee' is a visual onslaught on the audience from the Jayaram - Akku Akbar team that takes it by total shock. Faced with the unenviable choice of burying his head in his palms or throwing it back for a quick snooze, the viewer lets out one yawn after the other until the prospect of a lock jaw petrifies him.

References

2010s Malayalam-language films